Yukon Striker is a steel roller coaster at Canada's Wonderland in Vaughan, Ontario. Designed as a dive coaster from manufacturer Bolliger & Mabillard, the ride opened to the general public on 3 May 2019 in place of SkyRider, a roller coaster that was removed from the park in 2014. Its four inversions and drop length of  also set world records among dive coaster models.

History
Following the park's removal of SkyRider, Canada's Wonderland began preparations for a new ride. In 2014, the park requested a geotechnical investigation of the area, extracting soil samples to assess building a roller coaster's concrete foundation. On 19 December 2017, Canada's Wonderland filed an application for a permit to build nine support footers on the water and amend the waterway with a tunnel traveling under the pond within the park. A permit was required from the Toronto and Region Conservation Authority (TRCA), as parts of the ride, and the pond beneath it, fall within the Don River watershed. The application was approved by the TRCA on 9 January 2018, with construction on the ride's foundations beginning later that month. 

The diversionary channel was built under the pond in order to facilitate the creation of the underwater tunnel, as well as prevent silt runoff downstream. Construction for the diversionary channel, as well as the ride's underwater tunnel, required the temporary removal of two track pieces and a few supports belonging to Vortex, a roller coaster adjacent to Yukon Striker. Work on the tunnel was completed before the park opened for 2018, with the installation of four track pieces and two water pumps to pump rainwater out of the tunnel. With the tunnel completed, the removed pieces from Vortex were reinstalled, allowing for Vortex to be operational by the time the park reopened for the 2018 season.

In July 2018, following continuous construction during the operating season, the park began teasing a planned announcement scheduled the following month. On 15 August 2018, the roller coaster was officially introduced to the public, with renderings and details about the ride revealed. Construction for the roller coaster was completed on 4 February 2019, with the installation of the last track piece onto the 360-loop. Installation of the ride train, and landscaping of the surrounding area began after construction was completed.

On 24 April 2019, seventy-two people who helped raise funds for The Hospital for Sick Children were invited to test ride Yukon Striker. In the days that followed, members of the media from Ontario, and neighbouring Buffalo, New York, were invited to ride Yukon Striker. The ride was later opened to the general public on 3 May 2019, during the park's opening day for the 2019 season.

Characteristics
The ride was designed by Bolliger & Mabillard, with the Canadian construction firm, E.S. Fox, contracted to build the ride. Secant Engineers, a local structural engineering firm, was contracted to design the ride's tunnel, as well as the ride's foundations. It is the first Dive Coaster to be built in Canada.

The track is made up of 107 individual orange-coloured steel track pieces, the total of which weights 1,213 metric tonnes. There are 42 support columns used to support the ride. The steel used to build the roller coaster originated from Clermont Steel Fabricators in Batavia, Ohio.

Trains
Yukon Striker operates with three fiberglass trains each seating 3 rows of 8 for a total of 24 riders per train. The trains use vest restraints which were introduced on B&M's Wing Coasters. Each train is coloured a different colour, Gold, Silver or Bronze.

Ride experience
After departing the station, the train turns 180 degrees to the right and ascends  up the lift hill, traveling at an angle of 47 degrees. It then turns 90 degrees to the right, halting at the 90-degree drop, where a portion of the train hangs slightly over. After exiting the tunnel, the train rises into an Immelmann loop. Following the Immelmann loop, the train then enters a zero-g roll passing Tundra Twister. This is followed by a complete 360-degree vertical loop, a first for a Dive Coaster and a second Immelmann loop before reaching the mid-course brake run, placed directly above Timberwolf Falls. The train dives down another steep drop into an airtime hill and then proceeds counterclockwise through a 360-degree helix that ends at the final brake run. One cycle of the ride lasts approximately 205 seconds.

Records

Upon opening in May 2019, Yukon Striker broke four Dive Coaster records and matched another Dive Coaster record. With four inversions, Yukon Striker also features the most inversions out of any Dive Coaster. In addition to these records, Yukon Striker also held the record for the tallest inversion on a roller coaster with its first inversion, a  Immelmann loop; although the record was only held for 57 days, overtaken by Steel Curtain, another new-for-2019 roller coaster located at Kennywood in West Mifflin, Pennsylvania.

In addition to breaking several Dive Coaster records, Yukon Striker also matched the record for the tallest dive coaster in the world. Upon its opening, Yukon Striker became the only dive coaster in the world to feature a 360-degree loop.

Reception
The Golden Ticket Awards is an annual set of awards given out by Amusement Today, a newspaper published for the amusement industry. The rankings are selected by an international poll conducted by the newspaper. In 2019, Yukon Striker was ranked as the 34th best steel roller coaster in the world. When Yukon Striker debuted in 2019, the newspaper named Yukon Striker the fourth Best New Roller Coaster of the year. In the same year, the ride received the Best Innovation Award from Amusement Today for the ride's loose article and transfer system.

See also
2019 in amusement parks
 List of Canada's Wonderland attractions

References

External links

 Official website

Roller coasters in Ontario
Roller coasters operated by Cedar Fair